Miss World Philippines 2021 was the 10th edition of the Miss World Philippines pageant. It was held on October 3, 2021 at the Subic Bay Exhibition and Convention Center Hall A in Subic Special Economic and Freeport Zone, Olongapo, Zambales, Philippines. The event was initially scheduled for July 11, 2021. However, due to the COVID-19 pandemic, it moved at least four times; first to July 25, 2021, second to August 8, 2021, third to September 19, 2021, and finally to October 3, 2021. Michelle Daniela Dee crowned Tracy Maureen Perez of Cebu City as her successor at the end of the event.

The coronation night made the headlines because the future winner Tracy Perez fell twice, the first time when she slipped on the edge of the platform and fell down the stairs of the stage before the announcing of winners; then shortly after she was crowned, during her first walk as the reigning queen, causing her crown to slip from her head. Many commentators expressed concern for the candidates and pointed out the extreme length of the ceremony (almost seven hours) during which they had to stand and walk in high heels throughout, that eventually made them feel exhausted.

In this edition, seven additional titleholders were also elected: Dindi Joy Pajares as Miss Supranational Philippines 2021, Kathleen Joy Paton as Miss Eco Philippines 2021, Emmanuelle Vera as Reina Hispanoamericana Filipinas 2021, Trisha Martinez as Miss Tourism Philippines 2021, Michelle Arceo as Miss Environment Philippines 2021, Shaila Mae Rebortera as Miss Multinational Philippines 2021, and Tatyana Alexi Austria as Miss Eco Teen Philippines 2021.

The pageant was broadcast by KTX.ph and GMA Network.

Results
Color keys
  The contestant Won in an International pageant.
  The contestant was a Runner-up in an International pageant.
  The contestant was a Semi-Finalist in an International pageant.

Elected titleholder
Candidate #22, Dindi Joy Pajares, was elected to compete and represent Philippines in the Miss Supranational pageant in Poland. Pajares was voted by her fellow Miss World Philippines 2021 candidates who participated in a poll organized in lieu of a staged competition due to the postponement of the finals night.

Awards

Special awards

Fast Track Events 
The winner of each fast track event will automatically advance to Top 24 of Miss World Philippines 2021.

Contestants
44 delegates competed for the eight titles.

Withdrawals
Pauline Robles of San Pablo, Laguna

References

External links 
 

2021
2021 beauty pageants
2021 in the Philippines